Downside School is a co-educational Catholic independent boarding and day school in the English public school tradition for pupils aged 11 to 18. It is located between Bath, Frome, Wells and Bruton, and is attached to Downside Abbey.

Originally a school for English Catholic boys, it was established in 1617 by English and Welsh monks living in exile at Douai, France. The monastic community returned to England in 1795, with both the community and its school initially housed in the Shropshire home of Sir Edward Smythe, a former pupil. By 1814, the abbey and school had been re-established at their present site, in Somerset. Downside School became fully co-educational in all year groups in 2005.

The school

Downside is run by lay staff and three members of the Benedictine community based at Downside Abbey. It has a board of governors consisting of a chairman and ten others. Of the latter, one is a member of the Benedictine community. In 2019 the school and the abbey became separate trusts.

The school is divided into six houses: five senior houses and one junior house, with both day pupils and boarders in the same houses. Each house takes its name from the community's martyrs or benefactors:

 Powell House although in the senior school is a Junior House for all boys in Third Form before they join their senior house in Fourth Form. It is named after the martyr Blessed Philip Powell, a monk of St Gregory's at Douai.
 Barlow House (Boys) is situated on the south side of the main quad. It is named after the martyr Ambrose Barlow who was also a monk of St Gregory's at Douai. The house colours are black and white.
 Caverel House (Girls) was formerly a boys' house but was re-furbished and changed to a girls' house following the admission of girls to Downside in September 2005. Caverel is named after the benefactor Abbot Philippe de Caverel. The house colours are green and white.
 Isabella House (Girls) was founded in 2007 as a second girls' house in the senior school. The house is situated in a purpose-built building in the south-east of the school grounds. The house is named after a benefactor, Infanta Isabella Clara Eugenia of Spain and Portugal. The house colours are gold and blue.
 Roberts House (Boys) is situated in the north and west sides of the main quad. It is named after the martyr and monk of St. Gregory's in Douai, St. John Roberts. The house colours are red and white.
 Smythe House (Boys) is situated in the east side of the main quad, and is named after the major benefactor, Sir Edward Smythe. The house colours are yellow and black.

History

Monks from the monastery of St Gregory's, Douai in the County of Flanders, came to Downside in 1814. In 1607, St Gregory's was the first house after the Reformation to begin convent life with a handful of exiled Englishmen. For nearly 200 years, St Gregory's trained monks for the English mission and six of those men were beatified by Pope Pius XI in 1929. Two of the monks, SS John Roberts and Ambrose Barlow, were among the Forty Martyrs of England and Wales canonised by Pope Paul VI in 1970.

Imprisoned then driven from France following the Revolution, the community remained at Acton Burnell in Shropshire for 20 years before finally settling in Somerset in 1814. The monastery was completed in 1876 and the Abbey Church in 1925, and raised to the rank of a minor basilica by Pope Pius XI in 1935 . Attached to the monastery, the school provides a Catholic boarding education for boys and girls between the ages of 11 and 18. During the 19th century, Downside remained a small monastic school. Dom Leander Ramsay founded the modern Downside and planned the new buildings, designed by Leonard Stokes, that opened in 1912 and now form two sides of the "Quad".

The 20th century brought about changes for Downside, with the expansion of the school buildings and the school population, numbering over 600 boys at one point. Over the decades, the number of pupils fell, but with development drives and renewed demand for boarding education, pupil numbers rose. Girls were admitted from 2004.  Since the opening of Isabella House in 2007, approximately 60% of the pupils are boys and 40% are girls.

Air crashes
On Saturday 15 May 1943, during a cricket match between the school and an army team, two Hawker Hurricane fighter aircraft appeared over the playing fields at around 3 pm. They proceeded to circle the fields, performing manoeuvres as they did so, an eyewitness describing them "diving over the field and banking steeply". In what would be the final pass, at around 3:20 pm, both aircraft flew across the cricket ground at an extremely low altitude and climbed rapidly to clear the tall fir trees bordering the field. The second aircraft appeared to clip the trees with its tail and nose-dived straight into the ground, crashing and bouncing, the burning debris finally coming to rest among the schoolboys watching the cricket match from an embankment. The pilot and nine people on the ground were killed, with 15 others injured, ten of them seriously.

In September 2013, a single-person aircraft crashed in the school grounds, causing the death of the pilot.

Child abuse

Following investigation into the English Benedictine Congregation, including Ampleforth College and Downside School, among other institutions, the Independent Inquiry into Child Sexual Abuse (IICSA) published a report in August 2018. Ten people connected to the two schools, mostly monks, were convicted or accepted a caution for abuse. The report said that appalling abuse was inflicted on pupils over a period of 40 years, but the schools tried to cover up the allegations. The chair of the inquiry, Alexis Jay, said that for decades the schools tried to avoid giving any information to police or authorities, with monks being "secretive, evasive and suspicious of anyone outside the English Benedictine Congregation", prioritising "the reputation of the Church and the well-being of the abusive monks" over safeguarding the interests of pupils. In 2001, after new procedures were introduced following the Catholic Church's Nolan Report, which recommended that abuse should be referred to the statutory authorities, monks gave the appearance of co-operation and trust, but in reality continued to cover up the abuse. A 2018 statement on the school's website embraced the findings of the Social Care Institute of Excellence (SCIE) audit, completed in March 2018, and released a revised and stringent Child Protection Policy. Andrew Hobbs, formerly the acting head, and designated safeguarding lead during the audits and the Independent Inquiry into Child Sexual Abuse (IICSA), was appointed headmaster of Downside in September 2018.

At that time the school did not have a separate legal status from the abbey, so the monastic trustees had financial and executive control of the school. The governors provided general direction and management.

In May 2020 it was revealed that in the time following the release of the 2018 IICSA report regarding child sex abuse at Downside School, the school had experienced significant financial problems due to spiralling legal costs, and, to raise money, had been forced to sell some of its Renaissance paintings.

Sports
Members of the school compete in a range of sports, including rugby, football, netball, hockey, cricket, golf, and tennis, and even the Downside Ball Game, a variation on Fives, played on a purpose-built outdoor court. Sports are played most afternoons, with every pupil expected to participate at least three times a week.

Cricket ground

The first recorded match on the school's cricket ground was in 1898, when the school played Lansdown.  In 1934, the ground hosted a single first-class match between Somerset and Glamorgan.

In media
In 2003, Downside was the setting for the Channel 4 television show, A Second Chance, in which Ryan Bell, a teenager from London, was sent to Downside to see if a "difficult" student would do better when educated in the independent sector. After excelling at Latin, biology, and on the rugby field, Bell was eventually expelled after being caught drinking.

Notable alumni

Alumni are known as Old Gregorians, after St Gregory, the School's Patron Saint.

References

External links

Profile on the ISC website

Schools of the English Benedictine Congregation
Roman Catholic private schools in the Diocese of Clifton
Private schools in Somerset
Member schools of the Headmasters' and Headmistresses' Conference
Boarding schools in Somerset
Catholic boarding schools in England
Cricket grounds in Somerset
Grade II* listed buildings in Mendip District
1606 establishments in England
Educational institutions established in the 1610s